"Chuck Versus the American Hero" is the 12th episode of the third season of Chuck. It first aired on March 29, 2010. Chuck is given a week's paid leave before being sent on his first mission as a real agent, and chooses to use that time in an effort to win back Sarah's heart.

Plot summary

Main plot
Chuck arrives in Washington, D.C. to be briefed on his new assignment in Rome and Beckman grants him a week's leave before shipping out when Chuck admits he doesn't feel he's ready. Beckman reveals that Chuck is not going to Rome alone, but will be allowed to assemble a team of agents of his choice. Chuck returns to Burbank, to meet the one person he wants most - Sarah.

Devon wants Chuck out of Burbank so Ellie also feels comfortable leaving. Morgan also agrees to help win Sarah back. They are soon joined by Casey, who sees Chuck's freedom in choosing his team as a chance to regain his government position. The three resolve to get Chuck and Sarah back together, but his first attempt fails when Sarah responds icily to his promotion. She admits after seeing him "kill" Hunter Perry, he's no longer the same man she fell in love with. Morgan, Casey and Devon refuse to let him quit, and borrow Jeff's spy gear-equipped van to kidnap Chuck and stakeout Sarah and Shaw on a date. While Morgan draws Shaw out of the restaurant by calling him in the guise of a Ring agent, Chuck moves in and lays out how he feels to Sarah. Shaw finds Morgan and the two are assaulted by actual Ring agents. Shaw attempts to get back to the restaurant to warn Sarah of the attack but is intercepted by other agents seeking to bring him in to the Director. Devon, thinking Shaw is going to interfere with Chuck and is unaware of the situation, tackles Shaw and they smash through a window, temporarily rescuing Shaw but disrupting Chuck's talk with Sarah.

The next morning, Ellie angrily confronts Chuck about coming to Devon, Casey and Morgan about Sarah and not her, and orders him not to give up on Sarah. Back at Castle, Shaw announces his intent to use himself as bait to target the Ring and its senior leadership in revenge for his wife's death. General Beckman approves of the plan, despite Sarah's objection that this is a suicide mission, saying Shaw will be a "true American hero", hence the episode title. Shaw swallows a tracking device to use as a target for an air strike and contacts the Director and agrees to come in. Chuck arrives as Shaw gives Sarah a goodbye kiss, and Shaw leaves after telling Chuck to take care of her. Sarah explains Shaw's intent to sacrifice himself, and that he can't be allowed to go alone. Chuck locks down Castle to trap her there, promising that Shaw won't be alone, then leaves to help Shaw. Sarah uses the connection between Castle and the Buy More to send a message to Casey, who soon arrives to free her from lockdown.

Shaw arrives at the rendezvous, where the Director's men forcibly extract the tracking device and take him to the compound where the Director is waiting. Chuck arrives and finds the tracker, and tipped off by Jeff and Lester (who were stalking Shaw after feeling left out of Chuck's efforts to get back Sarah), follows the Ring agents to their compound. In the bunker, the Director reveals to Shaw that before his death, Hunter Perry was smuggling stolen surveillance footage of Shaw's wife's death and plays it for him. Shaw snaps when the video shows that Sarah was the one to kill his wife and attacks the Director, who reveals he was never actually in the room, but that Shaw was interacting with a hologram. Shaw is then knocked unconscious. Meanwhile Chuck arrives as a B-2 begins its bombing run on the building. He fights his way through several Ring agents and rescues Shaw. Sarah pulls up in her car just in time to watch a bomb strike the building, and sees Chuck emerge unharmed with Shaw slung across his shoulders.

Back at Castle, Beckman congratulates Sarah, who admits that everything was done by Chuck. Chuck once again lays everything out to her and tells her that he loves her and wants to be with her, and repeats Sarah's previous offer in Prague by asking her to meet at the train station to run away together. He leaves her with a kiss and lets her make her own decision. Later, Casey arrives at Sarah's apartment to find her packing, and admits he was the one who killed Perry, noting that Chuck "didn't have the stones" to pull the trigger. At this confession, Sarah's face lights up, and she thanks Casey, who responds with wishing her a good life as he departs.

Before Sarah can leave to meet Chuck, Shaw arrives at her apartment, having escaped from the hospital, and tells her they have a new mission. While Chuck waits for her at Union Station, he is recalled by Beckman to Castle, where she shows him the video implicating Sarah in Evelyn Shaw's death. Chuck is shocked to realize that Shaw now knows the truth, and that Sarah is with him and in danger.

The episode ends as Shaw drives Sarah out to an undisclosed location to "settle an old score."

Production
Actor Mark Sheppard's casting was first indicated on December 10, 2009, and later confirmed by Maureen Ryan of the Chicago Tribune. More details emerged in an interview with ifmagazine.com, in which Sheppard confirmed he will be playing the Director of the Ring.

Production details
 The episode confirms that the unidentified woman Sarah shot as part of her red test was Evelyn Shaw, Daniel Shaw's wife.
 This is the first time Beckman's office has been visited by any character other than Director Graham or Shaw.
 After Devon, Casey and Morgan return home from spending the night in jail, Ellie comments on Casey's "public indecency." This is in reference to "Chuck Versus Operation Awesome," where to cover Devon's disappearance, Chuck tells her he was bailing Casey out of jail after he got drunk and arrested for public indecency.

Flashes
 Chuck flashes on the necessary code to enter into the vending machine at the Ring's base to activate the elevator.
 A flash on martial arts allows him to defeat the Director's henchmen and gain access to Shaw.
Chuck notes "No flash necessary!" as he tranquilizes a Ring agent, emphasizing the progress in his marksmanship skills.

References to popular culture
 After Chuck's first attempt to win back Sarah fails and Casey is ready to give up the effort, Morgan tells him "love is a battlefield" in reference to Pat Benatar's song of the same name.
 The scene where Sarah uses the frayed electrical wiring in Castle to signal Casey using Morse Code is a reference to a similar scene from the MacGyver episode "The Widowmaker" as well as the films Executive Decision and Air Force One.
 The soda machine as the entrance to the Ring's hideout is a reference to a similar device in Spies Like Us, the latest in the long series of references Chuck has made to the film.
 The man who receives the order to execute the airstrike from General Beckman has a tag identifying him as 'Bauer', This is a reference to 24, Roger Cross who played the ring agent also played Curtis Manning on 24.
 The scene in the bunker between Shaw and the Director mirrors the scene between Neo and the Architect in The Matrix Reloaded.

Critical response  
Steve Heisler of The A.V. Club rated the episode C+.

Lulu Bates of Television Without Pity gave the episode an A+ rating.

References

External links 
 

American Hero
2010 American television episodes